Max Brown (born 1995) is a New Zealand canoeist.

Originally from Whanganui, Brown is studying a Masters of Business Management at Waikato University. He is an accomplished musician and between training sessions teaches music to school students in Cambridge.

In 2013 he made his international debut at the Sydney Youth Olympic Festival before competing at the World Junior Championships in Canada in the K4 1000m – missing a place in the A Final by just one spot.

Brown paddling alongside Kurtis Imrie finished eighth in the A Final at the of the K2 1000m at the World Cup in Poznan in 2021. Coached by Tim Brabants, Kurtis and Max also qualified a New Zealand K2 1000m boat at the 2020 Oceania Canoe Sprint Championships in Sydney. Imrie finished runner up to Brown in the NZCT New Zealand Canoe Sprint Championships at Lake Karapiro in May 2021 in the K1 1000m. The pair will continue to team up and have been selected to represent New Zealand at the delayed 2020 Summer Games in Tokyo in the K2 1000m.

References

1995 births
Living people
New Zealand male canoeists
Sportspeople from Whanganui
Canoeists at the 2020 Summer Olympics
Olympic canoeists of New Zealand
20th-century New Zealand people
21st-century New Zealand people